"Jewish and democratic state" is the Israeli legal definition of the nature and character of the State of Israel. The "Jewish" nature was first defined within the Israeli Declaration of Independence in May 1948 (see Jewish state and Jewish homeland). The "democratic" character was first officially added in the amendment to Israel's Basic Law: The Knesset, which was passed in 1985 (amendment 9, clause 7A).

Numerous scholars and political observers have debated the definition, particularly whether the terms are contradictory or complementary. According to Israeli author and journalist Yossi Klein Halevi, "Israel is based on two non-negotiable identities. The homeland of all Jews, whether or not they are citizens of Israel, and it's the state of all its citizens, whether or not they are Jews."

Background

Jewish state

The Israeli Declaration of Independence identifies Israel as a "Jewish state" in the sense that, as an ethnicity, Jews can exercise their right to self-determination in their homeland. It does not, however, give the Jewish ethnic religion of Judaism any special status over other religions nor does it deny minorities any rights.

Democratic state
The word "Democratic" is absent throughout the Israeli Declaration of Independence. However, the declaration states the intention to:  and appeals to:

Basic Law of 1985
Since no constitution had been passed by 1985, the Supreme Court ruled that the Declaration of Independence document is a guiding principle of Israeli society and its state, the need to legally define the Jewish nature and Democratic character of the State of Israel arose. During the 1984 Knesset elections, religious ideas were brought up that were aimed at canceling the democratic character of Israel, and replacing it with a theocratic Halachic state, and thus in the eleventh Knesset session, the amendment to the Basic Law: the Knesset was passed (to become effective as of the Twelfth Knesset), that stipulated that:

Later usage
Since then the definition of "a Jewish and democratic state" was used in additional Basic Laws of Israel: Basic Law: Human Dignity and Liberty and Basic Law: Freedom of Occupation, that were legislated in 1992, and amended in 1994. These laws specifically states that:

Public debate
As part of a project to draft a constitution for Israel by the Israel Democracy Institute (IDI) led by former Chief Justice Aharon Barak, the country's Jewish and democratic character was described as follows:
The State of Israel is a Jewish state in the following two senses: it is the political framework in which the right of the Jewish people to self-determination is manifested and it is a "Jewish nation-state." A first and necessary condition to being a Jewish and democratic state is a decisive majority of Jews in the State. Israel's attribute as a Jewish and democratic state is conveyed through aspects of Zionism and Jewish heritage; first and foremost, each and every Jew has the right to immigrate to the State of Israel. Other aspects are Hebrew being the main official language of the State and the inextricable link to Jewish culture in public life. On the other hand, the characterization of the State as Jewish is not intended to bestow extra privileges on its Jewish citizens and does not obligate the imposition of religious requirements by state law.

The State of Israel is democratic in the following sense: the sovereign is the entire community of the nation's citizens (and it alone), irrespective of ethnic-national origin. In the main, the character of the State as a democratic country is manifested by two basic principles: the first being the recognition of the dignity of man qua man, and the second, derived from the first, is the recognition of the values of equality and tolerance. Arrangements regarding free and equal elections, the recognition of the core human rights, including dignity and equality, separation of powers, the rule of law, and an independent judiciary, are all drawn from these principles. Democracy's basic principles require equal treatment of all those included as citizens of the State, without regard to their ethnic, religious, cultural, and linguistic affiliations.

The IDI concludes that "the definition of Israel as a 'Jewish state' does not contradict its definition as a 'state of its citizens.' Although the State is Jewish in that, within its framework, the realization of certain interests of the Jewish people is ensured and its identity is protected and developed, nonetheless, its sovereignty lies in its community of citizens, including the non-Jewish community."

The boundaries of the definition of "a Jewish and democratic state" are subject to public discourse in Israel, in context of the relation between state and government. Already in 1994, the question whether Israeli Government (i.e. the Cabinet) is permitted to limit the import of Non-Kosher meat, despite the Basic Law: Freedom of Occupation arose. Initially, the Israeli High Court of Justice ruled that the government is not permitted to limit such import of non-Kosher meat. However, after the Knesset passed some amendments to the basic laws, the limit was included.

Another debate was on the issue of whether the state is permitted to limit the leasing of national land in certain areas of Israel exclusively to Jews.

The Diversity of Israeli Society has produced a few main approaches to the definition of "a Jewish and Democratic State", which the current commonly accepted approach is the combination of all of them: "A Torah State" (Halachic state), "National-Religious State", "National Culture State", "The State of the Jewish People", "The Jewish State", and "The Jewish State and the State of all its citizens".

According to a 2013 Israel Democracy Institute poll, three-quarters of Israeli Jews "believe that the State of Israel can be both Jewish and democratic", whereas two-thirds of Israeli Arabs do not believe that such a combination is possible.

Commentary by the Israeli High Court of Justice 
The Fifteenth Knesset again amended the "Basic Law: The Knesset", in order to enforce the limit not only upon a party of candidates list but also upon each individual, separately:

During the Elections for the 16th Knesset, the Israeli Central Elections Committee disqualified the candidacy of Azmi Bishara and of Ahmad Tibi based upon this law. The petition to disqualify right-wing activist Baruch Marzel was rejected. As a result of this rejection, petitions were submitted to the High Court of Justice against all three rulings of the Central Elections Committee. Therefore, the clause within the Basic Law: The Knesset, was now a subject to a thorough judicial examination by the High Court of Justice, and eventually the High Court of Justice had turned around the former two ruling by Central Elections Committee, and approved the latter, hence, all three candidates were permitted to participate in the elections.

Regarding the meaning of the definition of "Jewish and democratic state" in this section of the law, then President of the Supreme Court of Israel, Aharon Barak, wrote that a narrow interpretation should be given to it, since it limits a basic right, in contrast to the broader interpretation that should be given to laws concerning Human rights.

Concerning the minimal interpretation of "a Jewish State", Justice Aharon Barak ruled that:

According to Chief Justice Barak the minimal definition of "a Democratic State" is:
 
Therefore:

Chief Justice Barak pondered whether every candidates list objecting the existence of Israel as a Jewish and democratic state should be disqualified, or a "Probabilistic standard" should be adopted, wherein according to this standard, a candidates list may be disqualified only if there is a real chance that it will actually succeed in promoting its goals that are in contradictory to the nature of Israel as a Jewish and democratic state. Eventually, he left that question open for future judicial debate, stating that "it requires more review".

See also
 Jewish state, a political term used to describe Israel as the homeland state for Jews worldwide
 Halakhic state, a Jewish state that factors Judaism and Jewish religious law into most or all aspects of governance
 Homeland for the Jewish people, an idea rooted in Jewish history, culture, and religion
 Basic Law: Israel as the Nation-State of the Jewish People, an Israeli Basic Law passed in 2018
 Der Judenstaat, an 1896 German-language book published by Theodor Herzl
 Ethnic democracy, a political system that combines a structured ethnic dominance with democratic, political, and civil rights for all

References

6. Joseph E. David, The State of Israel: Between Judaism and Democracy(Jerusalem: IDI Press,2003)

External links

A Jewish and Democratic State, WZO.

Law of Israel
Democracy
Religion in Israel
Jewish nationalism